Brian Burres (born April 8, 1981) is an American former professional baseball pitcher. Burres' best pitch is his changeup. He also has a high 80s-low 90 MPH fastball and a curveball. He played in Major League Baseball (MLB) for the Baltimore Orioles, Toronto Blue Jays and Pittsburgh Pirates and in the CPBL for the Lamigo Monkeys.

High school and collegiate career
Burres attended Sam Barlow High School in Gresham, Oregon, where he was named both Conference Player of the Year and Pitcher of the Year in 1999, his senior year. Burres went on to play at Mount Hood Community College, being drafted by the San Francisco Giants after one year.

Professional career

San Francisco Giants
Burres was originally drafted by the San Francisco Giants in the 31st round (931st overall) of the 2000 MLB draft. He was in the Giants' system for three years. Following the 2005 season, the Giants signed utility infielder José Vizcaíno. They made room for Vizcaíno on the roster by designating Burres for assignment. He pitched for the Connecticut Defenders prior to being designated. He was later released.

Baltimore Orioles
On January 6, 2006, Burres was claimed off waivers by the Baltimore Orioles. He never cleared waivers, so the Orioles released him. Six days later, he was assigned to Triple-A Ottawa.

On September 8, 2006, Burres made his major league debut with the Orioles, allowing two earned runs on three hits in two-thirds of an inning against the New York Yankees. He spent most of the 2006 season with Triple-A Ottawa, going 10–6 with a 3.76 ERA in 26 starts with the Lynx. He was promoted to the Orioles for most of the 2007 season, finishing the season 6–8 with a 5.95 ERA in 37 games (17 starts). Burres was named the fifth starter in the Orioles rotation to open the 2008 season, after a competition in spring training with teammate Matt Albers.

On February 2, Burres was designated for assignment to make room on the roster for Rich Hill.

Toronto Blue Jays
On February 4, 2009, Burres was claimed by the Toronto Blue Jays.

Burres spent spring training 2009 with Toronto, and was assigned to Triple-A Las Vegas 51s. With Toronto dealing with early-season injuries to several pitchers, Burres was recalled to the majors by the Jays on April 24, 2009, and made his first appearance for Toronto the next day, starting on the road against the Chicago White Sox. He wound up as the losing pitcher, but held the White Sox to two runs through the first four innings, before struggling in the fifth inning, when he left the game. Jays' manager Cito Gaston stated that Burres would remain in the rotation until several of Toronto's injured pitchers make their return to active duty.

Pittsburgh Pirates
On January 4, 2010, Burres signed a minor league contract with the Pittsburgh Pirates with an invite to spring training. He was non-tendered after the season. On January 3, 2011, Burres re-signed with the Pirates on another minor league deal.

Return to San Francisco
On December 19, 2011, Burres returned to his original team, the San Francisco Giants, signing a minor league deal with an invite to spring training.

Lamigo Monkeys
On February 4, 2013, after little interest from MLB and NPB teams, Burres signed with the Lamigo Monkeys of the CPBL in Taiwan.

Southern Maryland Blue Crabs
After pitching the previous season in Taiwan and not receiving a major league offer, Burres signed a contract to pitch for the with the Southern Maryland Blue Crabs of the Atlantic League of Professional Baseball.

Colorado Rockies

On June 9, 2014, Burres signed a minor league contract with the Colorado Rockies.

Southern Maryland Blue Crabs
Burres re-signed with the Southern Maryland Blue Crabs for the 2015 season. He became a free agent after the 2015 season, and re-signed with the Blue Crabs on April 5, 2016. He became a free agent after the 2016 season.

Personal life
Brian has an identical twin brother, Greg, who resides in the Pacific Northwest. Brian is the son of Nancy and Kirk, and has two other brothers, Kevin and Patrick. Brian married Lacy on the July 14, 2014, episode of Say Yes to the Dress: Atlanta.

Brian competes every year in the prestigious “Battle for the Boot” golf tournament held at Bandon Dunes and has won three times (2012, 2016, 2022).

References

External links
, or CPBL

1981 births
Living people
American expatriate baseball players in Canada
American expatriate baseball players in Taiwan
Arizona League Giants players
Baltimore Orioles players
Baseball players from Oregon
Colorado Springs Sky Sox players
Fresno Grizzlies players
Hagerstown Suns players
Indianapolis Indians players
Lamigo Monkeys players
Las Vegas 51s players
Major League Baseball pitchers
Mesa Solar Sox players
Mt. Hood Saints baseball players
Naranjeros de Hermosillo players
American expatriate baseball players in Mexico
Norfolk Tides players
Norwich Navigators players
Ottawa Lynx players
Pittsburgh Pirates players
Salem-Keizer Volcanoes players
San Jose Giants players
Southern Maryland Blue Crabs players
Sportspeople from Oregon City, Oregon
Toronto Blue Jays players